Larry Green may refer to:

Larry Green, a member of The Edsels American doo-wop group
Larry Green (musician), who charted with his recording of "Bewitched, Bothered and Bewildered"
Larry Green (wrestler), winner of the WCWA Texas Tag Team Championship in November 2000
Larry Green (Texas politician), member of the Houston City Council that represented district K, he overdosed on methamphetamine in 2018

See also
Lawrence Green (disambiguation)
Laurence Green (disambiguation)
Larry Greene (disambiguation)